Smaragdinella fragilis  is a species of sea snail, a bubble snail, a marine gastropod mollusk in the family Haminoeidae. 

The scientific name of the species was first published in 2008 by Bozzetti.

Description
The length of the shell attains 7.4 mm.

Distribution
This marine species occurs off Madagascar.

References

 Bozzetti L. (2008). Smaragdinella fragilis (Gastropoda: Opisthobranchia: Smaragdinellidae) nuova specie dal Madagascar meridionale. Malacologia Mostra Mondiale 61: 19-20

Haminoeidae
Gastropods described in 2008